The LG5 (PLAGF military designation: QLU-11 or QLU-131) is a semi-automatic grenade launcher developed by Norinco and introduced in 2011.  The launcher's designation "QLU" stands for "light weapon (Qīng Wŭqì) - grenade (Liúdàn) - sniper (Jūjī)" in Chinese military coding standard.

Description
The LG5/QLU-11 can be equipped with free-floating barrel, a fire-control system with a laser rangefinder, thermal imaging capability, and a ballistic computer that gives it air burst capability. The QLU-11 was tested in combat against Somali pirates in the Gulf of Aden by Chinese marines. 
The LG5/QLU-11 is designed for long-range use and so has been described as a "sniper" grenade launcher. 

Befitting that designation, it is said to have a very high accuracy of 3-round R100 accuracy of 1 meter at 600 meter range, meaning that with proper aiming the weapon can put three successive high-explosive rounds into a typical window or door. Its development was inspired by the American Barrett XM109 anti-materiel rifle, which fires 25 × 59 mm grenades, and its design is based on the Chinese HSARI LR2 .50 caliber anti-material rifle.

QLU-11 utilizes new Type 11 precision cartridge that derived from the DFJ-87 armor-piercing grenade. The weight is reduced from 217g to 200g due to lighter casing. Propellant takes larger percentage of the cartridge space, thus improving the velocity from 195m/s to 320 m/s. This modification greatly increases the recoil, which QLU-11 features advanced primer ignition (API) blowback, a large muzzle brake, floating receiver, and two sets of buffer mechanism inside the stock to mitigate.

To ensure the long-range accuracy, the electro-optical sight system with built-in fire control system is standard issue for the QLU-11. The daylight scope is designated QMD-131, while the night vision version is designated QMV-131. Both scopes feature in-scope HUD, a laser rangefinder, temperature sensor, ammo selection, ballistic calculated reticle, elevation angle sensor, inclination angle sensor, drift correction sensor, self-diagnosis software. The effective range is 1,000 meters for daylight scope and 800 meters for night vision scope.

Ammunition

LG5
BGJ5 high-explosive, dual-purpose (HEDP) sniper grenade, 40×53mm
BGL3 high-explosive precision grenade, 40×53mm
BGL3A programmable airburst grenade, 40×53mm
BGH1 high-explosive incendiary grenade, 40×53mm
BGR1 incendiary grenade, 40×53mm
BGS1 training grenade, 40×53mm

QLU-11
Type 11 high speed precision cartridge
Type 11 programmable airburst cartridge

Variants
There are two variants of the weapon, an export version and a domestic version:
LG5: Export 40x version. Fires 40×53mm HV NATO grenades or 40x53mm BGJ-5 grenades
QLU-11: Domestic 35x SR version. Fires 35x32mm SR grenades

Users

See also 
QBU-10
QTS-11
XM25 CDTE
Barrett XM109
Neopup PAW-20

References

Grenade launchers of the People's Republic of China
Semi-automatic rifles
Anti-materiel rifles
API blowback firearms
Military equipment introduced in the 2010s